Surviving: A Family in Crisis (also known simply as Surviving, and later released on VHS as Tragedy) is a 1985 ABC television film.  Directed by Warris Hussein and starring Zach Galligan, Molly Ringwald, and River Phoenix, the film is described as a modern-day Romeo & Juliet story that examines the tragedy of teen suicide, and the loved ones left behind to pick up the pieces.

Plot
Rick (Zach Galligan) is the apple of his father's eye; smart, handsome, and idolized by his younger siblings (River Phoenix and Heather O'Rourke). By stark contrast, Lonnie (Molly Ringwald) is a troubled and withdrawn girl, struggling to put the painful memory of a suicide attempt behind her.  Both teenagers are dealing with loneliness and family pressures when they begin to find solace in each other, and a young romance develops. As Rick and Lonnie's bond begins to grow stronger, and they become increasingly withdrawn from their friends and families, their protective parents begin to worry that the young lovers are becoming too involved and grow increasingly uncomfortable with the teenagers' relationship. Finally, when Rick's parents (Ellen Burstyn and Len Cariou) decide that Lonnie is a bad influence on their son, and Lonnie's parents (Marsha Mason and Paul Sorvino) decide that boarding school would be the best place for their troubled daughter, Rick and Lonnie, desperate not to be separated, make a tragic decision to take their own lives. In the wake of the young lovers' fatal suicide pact, the two devastated families are left to try and pick up the pieces of their shattered lives and must somehow find a way to go on.

Cast

Awards

Reception
The initial airing of the film brought in an 18.1 rating and a 26 share, ranking third in its timeslot, and ranking 23rd out of 66 programs aired that week.

Novelization
A novelization of the film was written by Elizabeth Faucher and published by the Scholastic Corporation.

References

External links

1985 television films
1985 films
1980s teen drama films
ABC network original films
American teen drama films
American drama television films
Films about suicide
Films directed by Waris Hussein
Films scored by James Horner
1980s English-language films
1980s American films
English-language drama films